Piedmont High School is a public high school located in Piedmont, California, United States, and is one of two high schools in the Piedmont Unified School District.

Piedmont High School has officially been awarded the Blue Ribbon School Award of Excellence by the United States Department of Education.

Background

Many families move into Piedmont for the schools once their children reach school-age. For them, Piedmont High School offers ninth through twelfth grade. 

Piedmont's colors are purple and white (representing the Scottish thistle), and its mascot, the Highlander, reflects the school's Scottish heritage.

History

In September 1922, the Piedmont Unified School District opened the city's first high school. It was funded by a bond passed by voters in 1920.

Piedmont High School was the last public school in California to require uniforms, which disappeared in the 1970s.

The social scene was once dominated by social clubs, which resembled college sororities and fraternities, reminiscent of Lindsay Lohan's Mean Girls. While the social clubs raised money for the organizations with which they were affiliated, their charitable exterior was just a front for what they really were, mainly drinking clubs. The male clubs died out in the mid-1990s when they grew irrelevant, but the female social clubs didn't end until 2004 when the incoming senior class exhibited overwhelming indifference and distaste for retaining the tradition. "The school was covered in the New York Times when, in the mid-1990s, it began breathalyzing all students before dances.

In 2012, the school was covered by many major news outlets for a scandal in which members of the football team created a points system for engaging in sexual activity with female students at the school, unbeknownst to most of the women.

Campus

Piedmont High School has an open campus, and students can leave during brunch, lunch, and unscheduled periods. The campus is between Piedmont Park on the right of the school and Piedmont Middle School and Witter Field on the left.

The center of campus is a grassy area referred to as "the quad." The quad is the center of campus, connecting the former site of the Alan Harvey Theatre, the library, the cafeteria and student center, and the amphitheater. Classes are scattered around campus, with the music and science buildings the furthest apart.

The campus was originally built on a portion of Piedmont Park, and dog-walking trails behind the school connect to the park.

Architecture

The school was built in 1921 in a neoclassical design, part of the same plan that built the Piedmont city's Exedra. Since its designed by architect W.H. Weeks, the school has undergone several reconstructions, for reasons such as expansion, earthquake retrofitting, and combatting dry rot.

In 1974, the school was declared unsafe, under state earthquake laws. It was demolished, and three new classroom buildings and a gymnasium were built. The original library, quad, and administration buildings were rehabilitated.

Reconstruction in the 1970s reflected the "back-to-nature" look popular at the time, using wood instead of shingles. The school's "breezeway," an open, wide corridor running between the school's main buildings, exemplifies this.

The last construction was an expansion of the gymnasium, during the 2003–2004 school year, to include an entrance room that also displays trophies. The school has undergone further construction following Measure E, which issued $56 million in bonds for the reconstruction of school facilities to meet earthquake safety guidelines.

Academics

Piedmont High School is an academically strong school, scoring a 10 out of 10 for test scores at the website GreatSchools.net. In 2008, it was ranked in the top 100 schools in the nation by U.S. News & World Report. The school newspaper reported that the average of GPA of 2006's graduating class was 3.47.

Courses

Advanced Placement
As of 2009–2010, the school offers the following AP courses.
AP Biology
AP Calculus AB
AP Calculus BC
AP Computer Science (both AP Computer Science A and AP Computer Science Principles)
AP English Literature
AP Environmental Science
AP French Language
AP Music Theory (offered bi-yearly)
AP Spanish Language
AP Studio Art 2D
AP Studio Art 3D
AP United States History
AP Chinese Language and Culture

In addition, honors courses in physics, chemistry, and statistics are offered.

Creative and performing arts
Art classes come in various fields: music (a cappella, band, orchestra, AP Music), visual art (2-D art, ceramics, 2-D AP, 3-D AP), drama (Acting I through IV), dance (Beg-Adv). The school also produces a musical every year as a part of extracurricular.

Electives
Other electives offered include the Pride (yearbook) and the Piedmont Highlander (school newspaper), law and society, public speaking, multiple computer classes, and creative writing.

Foreign language
Spanish, French, and Mandarin are the only three foreign language courses it offers. In 2007-2008 an AP Mandarin course was added. Before the 2007–2008 school year, Mandarin classes ranged from Mandarin I to Mandarin V (honors). The Mandarin program was added in 1995–1996, when it replaced German.

Recent changes

2006-2007
An AP European History course was added, while the junior-level course Honors Chemistry was opened to qualifying sophomores.

2007-2008
The current Mandarin V (honors) was replaced by AP Mandarin.

The science curriculum changed from the system of "Integrated Science" to specific subjects, such as biology. In the old system, students took Integrated Science I as freshmen, Integrated Science II as sophomores, and either chemistry or honors chemistry as juniors.  The new system allows incoming freshmen to choose between physical science (for "most students") and biology (for "students showing mastery of PMS science"). The options are shown in detail below:

ROP-funded journalism, sports medicine, and biotechnology were added.
Also, math progression was clearly defined as follows

Honors society
The school decided to form its own honors society following the 2005–2006 school year. The new group, the Piedmont Honors Society, has a GPA cut-off of 3.60. In addition, there is a community service requirement of 15 pre-approved hours for sophomores, 25 for juniors, and 35 for seniors. The class of 2007 is the last class to maintain eligibility and membership with CSF.

School publications
The school newspaper is the Piedmont Highlander, and the yearbook is the Pride but both were known as the Clan-O-Log until 2017. Both have existed since the early decades of Piedmont High history, and participants of each publication are involved by taking the offered course. In 2006, the Highlander placed sixth in the National Scholastic Press Association's Best of Show contest. In 2007, the library's Teen Advisory Board revived the publication of the literary magazine The Highland Piper, which had last been published in the 1970s. The publication has since been discontinued.

Demographics

The majority of the student body is White, 68%, and Asian, 22%. In 2004, the San Francisco Chronicle highlighted the lack of racial and socioeconomic diversity in Piedmont in a Sunday front-page story. Comparing schools in Oakland and Piedmont, the article wrote that "wealth has created separate and unequal schools in [the] Bay Area and elsewhere."

The majority of high school students have lived in Piedmont since elementary school. As in the surrounding cities, only residents of the city can attend school at the district, unless a parent is a district employee. Homes with physical addresses in Oakland that partially abut sections of the Piedmont borders can also send their children to Piedmont schools.

Library

At the beginning of the 2006–2007 school year, the library set up the Teen Advisory Board, a group for students to contribute to the library through writing book reviews, recommending purchases, buying books, decorating the library, organizing library events, and publishing a literary magazine. The literary magazine, The Highland Piper, was launched in the spring of 2007 to publish student original writing. It took its name from the school literary magazine published in the 1930s. It was last printed in June 2009, but a new edition is planned for spring 2014.

Bird Calling Contest
Piedmont High is home to the nationally known Leonard J. Waxdeck Bird Calling Contest. Winners of the contest have been featured on the Late Show with David Letterman, The Ellen DeGeneres Show, and The Tonight Show Starring Johnny Carson. The contest was started in 1963 by biology teacher Leonard J. Waxdeck.

Sports

PHS offers a variety of varsity and junior varsity sports. In addition, many Piedmont students participate in the national championship-winning rowing team Oakland Strokes; at least one Piedmont graduate, Scott Gault, has competed in the Olympics and World Rowing Championships.

Fall
Men's American football ( JV, VAR)
Women's volleyball (JV, VAR)
Women's tennis (JV, VAR)
Women's golf (VAR)
Women's cheerleading (VAR)
Water polo (JV, VAR)
Cross country (JV, VAR)

Winter
Soccer (JV, VAR)
Basketball (FR, JV, VAR)

Spring
Coed Badminton (VAR)
Men's baseball (JV, VAR)
Women's softball (JV, VAR)
Men's tennis (JV, VAR)
Men's golf (VAR)
Lacrosse (JV, VAR)
Swimming (JV, VAR)
Track and field (JV, VAR)
Rugby (A, B)

Piedmont High football ex-coaches Kurt Bryan and Steve Humphries created the A-11 offense, a controversial football offense in which any of the 11 players on the field is eligible. The offense relies on confusion, and its unconventional look can wreak havoc on even bigger, stronger and faster teams.

In 2004 and 2005, the nationally-ranked women's basketball team won two consecutive division IV state championships.

In 2005, the men's varsity Cross Country team became the only men's team to win a state title in the history of the school.

In 2010, Piedmont lacrosse posted a 15–7 record and won a regular-season BSAL championship.

In 2011, the boys' tennis team finished the season as BSAL League champs, not having lost a league match in 11 straight years.

PHS uses the Highlander, a kilt-clad Scotsman caricature playing the bagpipes, as its mascot.

Notable alumni

Ruth Leach Amonette, first female vice president of IBM
Dyke Brown, graduated in the class of 1932, best known for founding The Athenian School, a college preparatory boarding school located in Danville, California.
Dean Butler, graduated in the class of 1974. Professional actor best known for work on Little House on the Prairie.
Vern Corbin, All-American basketball at Cal in 1928–29
Clint Eastwood spent part of his academic career in Piedmont before switching to Oakland Technical High School in neighboring Oakland, California
Chloe Fineman, class of 2006. Comedian and Saturday Night Live featured player.
Brad Gilbert, professional tennis player (World # 4) and coach
Dana Gilbert, tennis player
Alex Hirsch, creator of Gravity Falls.
Robert McNamara, former Secretary of Defense, graduated in 1933 after maintaining a straight "A" average
Asieh Namdar, class of 1984. CNN journalist.
Drew Olson, former UCLA quarterback
J. Christopher Stevens, class of 1978. Ambassador to Libya, killed 11 September 2012 in Benghazi.
Colin Trevorrow, class of 1995, film director of Jurassic World and sequels

References

External links

Official website
The Highland Piper
 Piedmont Unified School District Mandarin Program website
 The Hairy Lawn News - HairyNet: Irreverent look back at the late 1960s and early 70s -  includes classmates bulletin board

Piedmont, California
High schools in Alameda County, California
Educational institutions established in 1921
Public high schools in California
1921 establishments in California